Moosomin Lake is a man-made lake in south-eastern part of the Canadian province of Saskatchewan. Created by the damming of Pipestone Creek in 1954, Moosomin Lake is located about 10 kilometres south of the town of Moosomin and is in the Souris River watershed. The reservoir's uses include irrigation, water supply, and recreation. Moosomin Lake Regional Park is on lake's western shore.

The town of Moosomin gets its drinking water from wells alongside the lake. From the wells, the water is piped to town.

In 2011, much of the Souris River watershed flooded in a greater-than-one-in-a-hundred year flood event. While the well shacks are a few feet higher than the normal water level in Moosomin Lake, due to the rising water levels, sandbags had to be used around the wells to protect them from being contaminated. After the waters receded, permanent three-foot clay dykes were built at the well site to protect the wells from future potential flooding.

Geology
Moosomin Lake sits in the Pipestone Valley, which was created about 15,000 years ago with the melting of the last ice age. The valley was cut by the melting waters from glacial Lake Indian Head and is called the Pipestone Spillway.

Moosomin Dam 
Construction of the dam along the Pipestone Creek began in 1953 and work was completed by November 1954. The dam is located at NW 29-12-31 W1, which is at the south-east corner of the lake. It is an earth-filled embankment dam that is 13.5 metres high with an uncontrolled overflow concrete spillway and a gated riparian outlet. The total amount of land flooded for the reservoir is 389 hectares.

Moosomin Lake Regional Park 
Moosomin Lake Regional Park opened up in 1955 along the western shore of the lake. The park is 14 kilometres from the town of Moosomin and can be accessed off Highway 709, which is just off Highway 8. The park features camping, swimming, and boating. There are 125 serviced campsites plus unserviced over-flow sites. The beach area of the park has a sandy beach, a picnic area, and a playground. There are also boat launches and a marina that was built in 2015. Just outside the park, to the east near the dam and along Highway 8, is the 9-hole Pipestone Hills Golf Course.

See also
Saskatchewan Water Security Agency
List of dams and reservoirs in Canada
List of lakes of Saskatchewan
List of protected areas of Saskatchewan

References

Lakes of Saskatchewan
Water management authorities
Dams in Saskatchewan
Protected areas of Saskatchewan